Pascal Morency (born February 20, 1982) is a Canadian former professional ice hockey forward.

Playing career
Morency originally started his junior career in the Quebec Major Junior Hockey League with the Chicoutimi Saguenéens in 1999. He played only 12 games before going to the Cape Breton Screaming Eagles for the rest of the 1999–2000 season and played there until 2002. During that period his team went to the playoffs every year that he played.

2001-02 was his final season with the Screaming Eagles, and that year he had a QMJHL league leading 596 penalty minutes and had his highest points year with 11 goals and 22 assists for 33 points.

In the 2002-03 season he played four games for the Hull Olympiques and finished the season with the Rouyn-Noranda Huskies both of the QMJHL. During his time with the Huskies he tallied 12 goals and 16 assists along with 340 penalty minutes.

He turned professional in 2003 and played in the United Hockey League for the Flint Generals during that season 8 goals and 6 assists to go along with his 248 penalty minutes.

In the 2004-05 season he joined the Pittsburgh Penguins association and was assigned to the Wheeling Nailers of the ECHL. While there he accumulated 17 points and had 252 penalty minutes. He was called up to the Wilkes-Barre/Scranton Penguins of the AHL and played 2 games.

In the 2005-06 season he was re-signed by the Wilkes-Barre/Scranton Penguins and assigned to the Nailers, but played only 17 games and was released from his contract.

In the 2006-07 season he played for the Fort Wayne Komets then of the UHL. During that season he accrued 204 penalty minutes in the regular season and 16 in the post season.

From the 2007-08 season until the 2009-10 season, Morency played for the Bridgeport Sound Tigers of the American Hockey League (AHL). During those seasons he played the fewest games per season in his professional career and accrued the fewest penalty minutes per season. In 2009, while at the New York Islanders summer training camp, he was involved in a fight where he was suspended for five preseason games and five regular season games.

For the 2010-11 season, he was signed to a two way contract by the Houston Aeros of the AHL, but was assigned to the Bakersfield Condors of the ECHL. He was recalled a number of times to Houston and played in 16 games with 2 points and 70 penalty minutes. While in Bakersfield, Morency played 36 regular season games with 27 points and 113 penalty minutes. The Condors were eliminated in the first round of the 2011 Kelly Cup playoffs, where he played in 3 games and had 4 points and 6 penalty minutes.

Career statistics

References

External links

1982 births
Bakersfield Condors (1998–2015) players
Bridgeport Sound Tigers players
Canadian ice hockey right wingers
Cape Breton Screaming Eagles players
Charlotte Checkers (1993–2010) players
Chicoutimi Saguenéens (QMJHL) players
Flint Generals players
Fort Wayne Komets players
Houston Aeros (1994–2013) players
Hull Olympiques players
KHL Medveščak Zagreb players
Living people
Rouyn-Noranda Huskies players
Wheeling Nailers players
Wilkes-Barre/Scranton Penguins players
Ice hockey people from Montreal
Canadian expatriate ice hockey players in Croatia